Ghost Brigade were a six-piece melodic death metal band from Finland, formed in 2005 and disbanding in 2020.

History

Formation and Guided By Fire (2007) 
Ghost Brigade was formed in 2005 by former members of the melodic death metal band Sons of Aeon (Wille Naukkarinen and Tommi Kiviniemi), the stoner metal band Sunride (Wille Naukkarinen, Veli-Matti Suihkonen and Janne Julin) and the death metal band Paraxism (Manne Ikonen).
They recorded several songs which were gathered in a demo, released in 2006.
The following year, they started to record several songs such as "Along The Barriers" and "Horns", which led to the band deciding to record their first proper studio album, Guided By Fire, with their "house engineer" Mikko Poikolainen.
It was released on 17 September 2007 via Season Of Mist as a digital download and later reissued in 2012 in a clear vinyl edition.
It was the first album of the band to feature Aleksi Munter, the keyboardist of the melodic death metal band Swallow The Sun and the only to feature Fredrik Nordin, the vocalist of the stoner metal band Dozer as guest vocals.

The band went on tour with Insomnium in Finland to promote the album between April and October 2007.

Isolation Songs (2009-2010) 
Two years after Guided By Fire, Ghost Brigade released their second album, Isolation Songs, on 3 August 2009 via Season Of Mist. The second album was produced by Antti Malinen.

About this album, Wille Naukkarinen stated:
"We had a few different working titles for this record but 'Isolation Songs' was the one that we collectively felt good about. I remember reading through the lyrics of this album just before we went to the studio in order to come up with an album title and the word 'isolation' came to mind several times. The songs themselves aren't directly about that at all but I think that having a feeling of being isolated has been an inspiration or a driving force to at least some of the content of these lyrics. And if you think about our songwriting process in general, Isolation Songs is probably the best possible title to characterize that as well. I, for example, have to be completely isolated from the outside world to write riffs, melodies and songs for Ghost Brigade; it just doesn't work any other way. We can't go to our rehearsal room and jam until we come up with something 'pretty cool.' This band digs deeper than that. And besides, Isolation Songs sounds like it's a title of a country album and that of course, is a big bonus.
It was a lot of work to get this album done, it took almost two years to write these songs, but now that it's 100% ready I can only say that I feel privileged to be a member of GHOST BRIGADE. I have a strong feeling we have created something very special with 'Isolation Songs' and it is by far my personal favorite of all recordings I've ever been a part of. I hope people will enjoy these songs as much as we do once they get the chance to hear them."

After the release of Isolation Songs, the band went on tour as the opener for fellow metal band Amorphis during their 2010 tour in Europe.

Lineup changes, hiatus and disbandment (2011-2020) 
Ghost Brigade released their third studio album, Until Fear No Longer Defines Us, on 19 August 2011.

In 2013, long-time bassist Janne Julin left the band and was replaced Joni Saalamo. The band also acquired a new keyboardist in Joni Vanhanen. With this new lineup, the band recorded their fourth studio album, titled IV: One with the Storm. It was released on 7 November 2014, again via Season of Mist. The album was produced by the band and Tuomas Kokko. In December of the following year, the band announced an indefinite hiatus in a Facebook post.

On 7 November 2019, the band announced their reactivation and scheduled a concert at the Tanssisali Lutakko venue for 10 April 2020 with a second show on the 11th added later that month. However, due to the COVID-19 pandemic, these shows were pushed back to August, and later cancelled. On 20 August 2020, the band announced their disbandment in a Facebook post.

Timeline

Band members
Final line-up:
 Manne Ikonen – vocals
 Tommi Kiviniemi – lead guitar
 Wille Naukkarinen – rhythm guitar
 Veli-Matti Suihkonen – drums
 Joni Saalamo – bass
 Joni Vanhanen – keyboards
Former members:

 Janne Julin – bass

Guest musicians:

 Aleksi Munter of Swallow The Sun – keyboards on Guided by Fire and Isolation Songs
 Fredrik Nordin of Dozer – backing vocals on Guided by Fire

Gallery

Discography

Studio albums 
Guided By Fire, 2007
Isolation Songs, 2009
Until Fear No Longer Defines Us, 2011
IV - One With the Storm, 2014

Demos 
Demo, 2006

References

External links 

Official Ghost Brigade website
Official Ghost Brigade Facebook
Ghost Brigade Myspace
Ghost Brigade Purevolume
Season of Mist records

Finnish heavy metal musical groups
Finnish melodic death metal musical groups
Finnish doom metal musical groups
Finnish progressive metal musical groups
Musical groups established in 2005
Musical_groups_disestablished_in_2020
Musical quintets
Season of Mist artists